Opsariichthys hainanensis is a species of cyprinid fish in the family Cyprinidae, or alternatively, family Xenocyprididae. It is endemic to Hainan (China).

References

hainanensis
Cyprinid fish of Asia
Freshwater fish of China
Endemic fauna of Hainan
Taxa named by John Treadwell Nichols
Taxa named by Clifford H. Pope
Fish described in 1927